Čista Mala is a village in Croatia, in the municipality/town of Vodice, Šibenik-Knin County.

Geography
Čista Mala is located in Ravni Kotari,  7 km from Skradin, and 10 km north of Vodice.

History
The Serbian Orthodox church of St. Nicholas was built in 1873.

The settlement was previously part of the Šibenik municipality.

Demographics 
According to the 2011 census, the village of Čista Mala has 119 inhabitants. This represents 19.97% of its pre-war population according to the 1991 census.

The 1991 census recorded that 93.96% of the village population were ethnic Serbs (560/596), 0.67% were Yugoslavs (4/596), 4.03% were ethnic Croats (24/596),  and 1.34% were of other ethnic origin (8/596).

Demographic history
2011 census: 119 inhabitants.
2001 census: 80 inhabitants.
1991 census: 596 inhabitants. 560 Serbs, 24 Croats, 4 Yugoslavs, 8 others and unknown.
1981 census: 577 inhabitants. 432 Serbs, 96 Yugoslavs, 19 Croats, 30 others and unknown.

{{Kretanje broja stanovnika
 |naslov  = 'Historical population 1857-2011 Naselja i stanovništvo Republike Hrvatske 1857-2001, www.dzs.hr
 |dimx    = 550
 |dimy    = 475
 |stanmax = 800
 |crta1   = 100
 |crta2   = 50
 |a1      = 1857
 |a2      = 1869
 |a3      = 1880
 |a4      = 1890
 |a5      = 1900
 |a6      = 1910
 |a7      = 1921
 |a8      = 1931
 |a9      = 1948
 |a10     = 1953
 |a11     = 1961
 |a12     = 1971
 |a13     = 1981
 |a14     = 1991
 |a15     = 2001
 |a16     = 2011
 |p1      = 203
 |p2      = 599
 |p3      = 206
 |p4      = 244
 |p5      = 290
 |p6      = 358
 |p7      = 440
 |p8      = 506
 |p9      = 618
 |p10     = 719
 |p11     = 760
 |p12     = 663
 |p13     = 577
 |p14     = 596
 |p15     = 80
 |p16     = 119
 |izvor   = Croatian Bureau of Statistics
 }}

Anthropology
The native families (starosjedioci''), all Orthodox by faith, were the: Berić, Vukojević, Vukša, Grulović, Dobrić, Lalić, Manojlović, Popović, Samardžić, Stjelja.

References

External links

Populated places in Šibenik-Knin County